Qala-e-Naw, also Qalay-e-Naw or Qalanou, is a district in the west of Badghis Province, Afghanistan. Its population was estimated at 82,525 in 1990; the ethnic makeup is approximately 80% Tajik, Hazara, with small numbers of Pashtun, Baloch, Uzbek and Turkmen.

The district capital is Qala e Naw city, which is also the provincial capital. The district is known for its pistachio forests.

See also
 Qala e Naw
 Badghis Province

References

External links

Districts of Badghis Province